Moylan–Rose Valley station is a SEPTA Regional Rail station in Nether Providence Township, Pennsylvania. Located at 4 Manchester Road, it serves the Media/Wawa Line. The station has a 149-space parking lot and a post office at the station. The Pennsylvania Institute of Technology is about 100 yards north of the station.

It is located near the communities of Media, Moylan, and Rose Valley.  Originally known as Manchester, and later Moylan, the current name reflects its geographical location near those areas.

Station layout
Moylan–Rose Valley has two low-level side platforms with a connecting pathway across the tracks.

References

External links

Moylan-Rose Valley Station | SEPTA train schedule
Station from Google Maps Street View

SEPTA Regional Rail stations
Stations on the West Chester Line
Former Pennsylvania Railroad stations
Railway stations in the United States opened in 1870